James Cowan (1816 – 24 November 1895) was a Liberal Party politician in Scotland.

He was the son of Alexander Cowan, papermaker and philanthropist. He was one of eleven children including Charles Cowan MP, and Sir John Cowan Bart.

He was Lord Provost of Edinburgh from 1872 to 1874.

He was elected at the 1874 general election as a Member of Parliament for Edinburgh, and held the seat until he resigned from the House of Commons in 1882 by the procedural device of taking the office of Crown Steward and Bailiff of the three Chiltern Hundreds of Stoke, Desborough and Burnham.

He is buried with his family on the west side of the original cemetery in Grange Cemetery in Edinburgh.

References

External links 
 

1816 births
1895 deaths
Scottish Liberal Party MPs
UK MPs 1874–1880
UK MPs 1880–1885
Lord Provosts of Edinburgh
Members of the Parliament of the United Kingdom for Edinburgh constituencies